Homeworld: Cataclysm was originally developed in 2000 as an expansion of Homeworld, but was released as a stand-alone game. It was published by Sierra Studios, as was the original, but it was developed by Barking Dog Studios. The game reappeared on the gaming website GOG.com in June 2017 as Homeworld: Emergence, as the name "Cataclysm" was trademarked by Blizzard Entertainment for its third expansion to World of Warcraft.

Gameplay
Though it uses the same engine as its predecessor, several changes were made such as: the ability to toggle time compression between normal speed and eight times faster; ship upgrades (improving armor and adding new abilities), Command Ships and Carriers are given the ability to add external modules for ship research and fleet support; fuel was eliminated from the game and finally the sensor display could be used to issue attack orders to units. The player's Command Ship is now capable of attack; though slow, the Command Ship is capable of delivering a high amount of firepower, most notably the Siege Cannon capable of crippling an enemy Command Ship with a single well aimed shot.

Notable unit changes include the Processor, Cataclysm'''s adaptation of the Resource Controller, which has medium-strength weapons to defend itself, automated repair beams to heal nearby ships and four pads to dock with Workers harvesting resources. The game's resource collectors perform the same functions that they did in the original Homeworld, however, when upgraded they can be used to capture enemy vessels, harvest crystals and repair friendly vessels; functions that were carried out by separate, single-function ships in the first game.

The game also introduced new 3D features such as moving parts and transforming ships.

In general, the main difference is the scale of fleets. Where Homeworld was biased towards large fleets (as the player's main ship was a full-fledged mothership and the opposition was an empire of galactic scale), Cataclysm down-scales the fleets (as the player's main ship is a simple mining vessel and the adversaries are all limited in resources)

Plot

The game takes place fifteen years after the original game. After destroying the Taiidan Emperor and reclaiming their ancient homeworld of Hiigara, the Kushan re-establish their clans, or "kiith", in a great council, though some clans have precedence over others. The Mothership, with Fleet Command and the hyperspace core removed from it, remains in orbit over Hiigara as a shipyard. Meanwhile, the Taiidan Empire has collapsed after years of civil war, and the new Taiidani Republic has arisen as an ally of the newly minted Hiigarans, while the Imperialists and their Turanic Raider allies continue to raid both Hiigaran and Republic space.

The campaign begins with the Kuun-Lan, a mining vessel belonging to Kiith Somtaaw (one of the minor clans), diverting from a mining mission to assist Kiith Nabaal carrier Veer-Rak and its fleet to defend Hiigara against the Imperialists' assault. While aiding the Hiigaran destroyer Bushan-Re against a force of Turanic Raiders, they soon find a derelict beacon pod, which the crew decides to capture and research with the aid of the research vessel Clee-San, sent by their clan leaders back on Hiigara, who want the beacon and its technology to be kept within Kiith Somtaaw in order to gain an advantage over the other clans. As they study it aboard the Kuun-Lan, a strange virus begins to take over the ship. The part of the ship containing the derelict is jettisoned; the Clee-San then scans the jettisoned part of the ship to determine what happened. As it scans, the jettisoned portion of the ship fires a beam at the Clee-San that subverts control of the ship and its escorts. To make matters worse, Turanic Raiders arrive and are also subverted, forcing the Kuun-Lan to flee.

Further research suggests that the derelict pod carried techno-organic nanobots which they call "the Beast", that can take control of machinery and even people. The Kuun-Lan seeks a Bentusi trading ship for help and finds it being attacked by a Beast fleet. The trading ship is hit with an infection beam and self-destructs to avoid being subverted. While other ships are assimilated by the Beast, the Kuun-Lan discovers that while the true origins of the Beast are unknown, it was first discovered by an alien vessel called the Naggarok, which had come from another galaxy a million years earlier and had picked up the Beast in intergalactic hyperspace. Before the Naggarok was fully assimilated, the drives and communications of the ship were destroyed by the crew, but the ship automatically released a distress beacon - still infected by the Beast - which the Kuun-Lan discovered. As the Kuun-Lan hunts for the Naggarok, they must also contend with the Imperialist Taiidani, who are experimenting with the Beast in an attempt to weaponize it.

Following this, the Kuun-Lan makes contact with a Hiigaran carrier known as the Caal-Shto, which takes the majority of the information that the Somtaaw have on the Beast so that they could return with reinforcements. Unfortunately, the Caal-Shto becomes subverted by unknown means and leads the Kuun-Lan into a trap, where the Hiigarans have to fend off a massive Beast fleet led by a mothership class vessel. This ship was no other than the former research module that they jettisoned early in the campaign. It was not only capable of communication, but was also seeking their origin point of the Naggarok. Despite these setbacks, the Kuun-Lan manages to locate their sister ship and finally get vital information to their homeworld, whose territories were on the verge of buckling with both attacks from the Imperialists and the spreading Beast infestation.

After several battles with infected vessels and Imperialist planetary bases, the Kuun-Lan discovers a siege cannon, which has the potential to be an effective weapon against the Beast. The cannon proves ineffective against Beast-controlled vessels as-is (it also overheats after a single shot), so the Kuun-Lan begins searching for the Naggarok so they can use a "pure" sample of the Beast to upgrade the cannon.  Upon encountering the Naggarok, they find that the Imperialists have allied with the Beast in return for control of half of the galaxy, seeking revenge for what the Hiigarans and the Bentusi had done to their Emperor and the collapse of their original rule. They started this by repairing the ship's primary systems. The Beast offers the Kuun-Lan a chance to join them, an offer that is rejected. The Naggarok, fully repaired, then escapes. As the cannon also uses Bentusi technology, the Kuun-Lan searches for the mysterious traders who had supported the Kushan exiles' claim to Hiigara. However, the Bentusi are panicked by the emergence of the Beast, and attempt to flee to another galaxy. The Kuun-Lan and its fleet destroy the Bentusi's slipgate and engage their tradeships, eventually shaming the Bentusi into helping them fight the Beast.

The Somtaaw fleet soon finds the Clee-San and captures it, using it to lure the infected portion of the Kuun-Lan (used by the Beast as a mothership) before the ship's reactor overloads; the Kuun-Lan then destroys the Beast mothership using the newly enhanced siege cannon. They then seek out the Nomad Moon, a Taiidani Republic battle station incorporating a powerful repulsor field; upon their arrival, they find that the station has already fallen to the Beast. The Naggarok, protected by the station's repulsor field, again offers the Kuun-Lan an alliance, an offer that is again refused. Acting on information from the Republic, the Kuun-Lan is able to destroy the Nomad Moon's repulsor field generators using vessels small enough to avoid its sensors, allowing the main fleet to destroy the station itself. The Imperialist Taiidani, seeing that the Beast did not intend to honor its bargain after witnessing the Bentusi appear, abandon the battle, leaving the Naggarok to be destroyed by the Somtaaw fleet.

After the destruction of the Naggarok, the remainder of the Beast-infected ships are destroyed and a vaccine to the infection is discovered, ensuring that the Beast would never return again. Kiith Somtaaw gains great prestige in Hiigaran society, and their members are honored with the title of "Beastslayers" for their prominent role in the destruction of the Beast.

Ships
Since "Homeworld: Cataclysm" takes place only 15 years after, and uses essentially the same game engine as "Homeworld", several ships make a return, notably in the 'new' Hiigarans/Kushan, and the Taiidan forces (both Imperialist and Republic).  Some new features in this game not previously seen are ship upgrades and Support Units- the latter of which put a lower cap on the player's fleet size as opposed to the maximum fleet size of 300 in "Homeworld".

While the Kushan and Taiidan fleets remain almost identical to their Homeworld counterparts, the player's clan, Kiith Somtaaw, is forced to scratch its own fleet specs based on salvaged technologies. The player's own ships are all new and superior to both Taiidan and Kushan counterparts and are only matched by the main adversary, the Beast and its own fleet (which is composed of assimilated Taiidan, Kushan, Somtaaw and Turanic Raider ships).

Reception

The game received "generally favorable reviews", just one point shy of "universal acclaim", according to the review aggregation website Metacritic. Samuel Bass of NextGen called it "one of those rare sequels in which more of the same is definitely a good thing."

The staff of Computer Gaming World nominated it as the best strategy game of 2000, although it lost to Sacrifice. The game was also nominated for the "Strategy Game of the Year" award at GameSpots Best and Worst of 2000 Awards, which went to Shogun: Total War.

LegacyHomeworld: Cataclysm works on both 32-bit and 64-bit versions of Windows XP, Vista, and 7 after being patched to version 1.01.  However, as with its predecessor, graphical glitches frequently occur when not using the software renderer. OpenGL may be enabled by running the game in compatibility mode of Windows NT 4.0 (Service Pack 5). The game is locked at a 4:3 aspect ratio, however, Widescreen resolutions may be applied by editing the registry.

The Remastered Edition (formerly Homeworld HD) from Gearbox Software, the new owners of the Homeworld IP, has been updated to be fully compatible with all versions of Windows and includes both updated and original copies of both games. This collection does not include Homeworld: Cataclysm'' as it has been reported that the source code for this game has been lost, while others report that potentially former developers have a backup and that the audio assets are available. In February 2015, Gearbox announced that they are still interested in remaking Cataclysm, if the source code would be found. In a February 18, 2015 Twitch interview, former Cataclysm developers stated that a remake should be possible even without the Cataclysm source code but with the "Homeworld Remastered" engine.

References

External links
 

2000 video games
Homeworld (video game series)
Real-time strategy video games
Video game expansion packs
Video games developed in Canada
Video games scored by Paul Ruskay
Windows games
Windows-only games
Space opera video games
Multiplayer and single-player video games